Dominique Jaylin Abrena Randle (born December 10, 1994), known in the United States as Dominique Jaylin Harris, is a footballer who plays as a center back for Icelandic club Þór/KA in the Besta deild kvenna. Born in the United States, she represents the Philippines women's national team.

Early life
Randle was born on December 10, 1994, to a Filipino mother, Catherine 'Cathy' (née Abrena), and an African-American father, Ivory Randle III, in Seattle, Washington, United States. She has three siblings: Ivory IV, Brittanee and Kaelani. A native of Sammamish, Washington, she studied at the town's Skyline High School and played for her school's women's football (soccer) team. She also coincidedly played for the US Olympic Development Program and local Washington club Eastside FC.

College career
In 2012, Randle would start attending the University of Southern California and become part of the USC Trojans soccer team. However she would not play on her first year with USC due to being redshirted. She would also not play in 2013 and 2016 due to an injury.

Club career
Randle has yet to join a professional club. In March 2022, she was invited to try out for Angel City of the National Women's Soccer League prior to the start of the 2022 season. In February 2023, she joined Þór/KA in Iceland's Besta deild kvenna.

International career
Randle is eligible to play for the Philippines. She would make her debut for the Philippines in their 1–0 win against Thailand at the 2022 AFC Women's Asian Cup.

Personal life
Randle is married to former NFL player DaJohn Harris.

Career statistics

International goals
Scores and results list the Philippines' goal tally first.

Honours

International

Philippines
Southeast Asian Games third place: 2021
AFF Women's Championship: 2022

Notes

References

1994 births
Living people
Citizens of the Philippines through descent
Filipino women's footballers
Women's association football central defenders
Philippines women's international footballers
Filipino people of African-American descent
People from Sammamish, Washington
Sportspeople from King County, Washington
Soccer players from Washington (state)
Soccer players from Seattle
American women's soccer players
USC Trojans women's soccer players
African-American women's soccer players
American sportspeople of Filipino descent
Southeast Asian Games bronze medalists for the Philippines
Southeast Asian Games medalists in football
Competitors at the 2021 Southeast Asian Games
Þór/KA players
Úrvalsdeild kvenna (football) players
Filipino expatriate footballers
American expatriate women's soccer players
Filipino expatriate sportspeople in Iceland
American expatriate sportspeople in Iceland
Expatriate women's footballers in Iceland